Howard Clifton "Kip" Smith IV  (born June 4, 1992) is an American football punter who is currently a free agent.  He played college football for UCLA and Oklahoma State University. He was picked up as an undrafted free agent by the Philadelphia Eagles after the  2015 NFL Draft.

Smith was cut by the team on September 4, 2015. Smith holds the longest field goal in Colorado High School history of 67 yards.

References

External links
 Oklahoma State Cowboys bio
 Philadelphia Eagles bio

1992 births
Living people
Players of American football from Albuquerque, New Mexico
American football punters
UCLA Bruins football players
Oklahoma State Cowboys football players
Philadelphia Eagles players
21st-century American politicians